Tell Johfiyeh (2200 BC) is an archeological site in the village of Johfiyeh, Jordan, which dates back to the Iron Age.

 
Geographical Location

• Middle East.

• Hashemite Kingdom of Jordan.

• North Jordanian plateau.

• 7.5 km south-west of Irbid.

• Northern edge of the modern village of Johfiyeh.

• Within an agriculturally intensively used area.

• Rainfed agriculture is possible.

The activities of 2002 indicate that Tell Johfiyeh and the small archaeological sites in its vicinity were used most probably as 
farmsteads, dating back to the 7th century BC. 
The following results were obtained:
Archaeological sites in the vicinity of Tell Johfiyeh
• Founded mainly during the Iron Age
• Usually re-settled during the Byzantine and Umayyad era
• Most probably agricultural facilities 
• The sites maintained relations to each other
• Tell Irbid or Tell el-Husn probably functioned as central sites 
• Two phases of settlement could be separated: Iron Age II and 
Byzantine-Umayyad era 
•z Remains of the latter were found exclusively on the south-
western fringe of the tell and at the eastern slope. Remains
of the Iron Age, however, were found all over the site and 
dominate the finds made so far.
• Remains of the Byzantine-Umayyad era are:
-A cistern
-Remains of a small house
-Two almost complete vessels of clay
-Numerous clay sherds, glass and metal remains
• The remains from the Iron Age belong to domestic activities 
within an agricultural world: 
-Numerous fireplaces and cooking spots, grinding-
stones,  mortars, basalt pestles and scrapers,
weaving-weights, spinning-whorls, a three-footed
basalt-bowl with tools, „buttons“, numerous stone-vessels, several arrow-heads made of iron and needles as well as a few  pearls from carneol

Further reading (Publications) 
 2007 Tell Johfiyeh. Ein archaeologischer Fundplatz und seine Umgebung in Nordjordanien.
Materialien fuer eine Regionalstudie, Alter Orient und Altes Testament
(AOAT) vol. 344, Ugarit Verlag, Muenster.
 in press Stable Carbon and Oxygen Isotopes of the Animal Tooth Enamel from the late
Iron Age Farmstead of Tell Johfiyeh in north Jordan: A Paleoclimate Study, Ugarit-
Forschungen (UF) Bd. 39, Ugarit-Verlag Muenster, 2008
 in press A period of peace and prosperity in Gilead. Tell Johfiyeh and ist surrounding
during the (late) Iron Age. A report on the 2002-2004 and 2007 seasons, Studies in
the history and archaeology of Jordan (SHAJ) X, Department of Antiquities,
Amman, 2009
 in press Tall Juhfiyya. Preliminary report on the 2004 and 2007 seasons, Annual of the
Department of Antiquities of Jordan (ADAJ) 52, Amman, 2008; Co-Author: al-Sa´ad,Z.
 in press Tell Johfiyeh, in Savage, S.H., Zamora, K.A. and Keller, D.R. (eds.),
Archaeology in Jordan, American Journal of Archaeology (AJA) 112, 2008; Co-Author: al-Sa´ad, Z.
 in press Der Tell Johfiyeh in Nordjordanien. Vom spätbronzezeitlichen Rundbau zum
eisenzeitlichen Gehöft, Das Altertum 53,1, Berlin, 2008
in press A period of peace and prosperity in Gilead. Tell Johfiyeh and ist surrounding
during the (late) Iron Age. A report on the 2002-2004 seasons, Akten der 52. RAI
 2008 Tall Johfiyeh. A brief report on the 2007 season, Newsletter of the Faculty of
Archaeology and Anthropology No. 27/28, Yarmouk University, Irbid-Jordan, pp. 7–
8; Co-Author: al-Sa´ad, Z.
 2005 Tell Johfiyeh, in Savage, S.H., Zamora, K.A. and Keller, D.R. (eds.), Archaeology
in Jordan, American Journal of Archaeology (AJA) 109, No.3, pp. 532–534; coauthor:
al-Sa´ad, Z.
 2005 Tell Johfiyeh. Ein eisenzeitlicher Fundplatz und seine Umgebung in Nordjordanien,
in Gerda Henkel Stiftung (Hrsg), Jahresbericht, pp. 20–21
 2004 Tall Juhfiyya: An Iron Age Site and its Surroundings in North Jordan. Preliminary
Report on the 2002 and 2003 Seasons. Annual of the Department of Antiquities of
Jordan (ADAJ) 48: 171-180, Amman; co-author: al-Sa´ad, Z.
 2004 Tall Juhfiyah and Neighbouring Sites: Part of an Iron-Age Trade, Defense- or
Communication System ?, in Khraysheh, F. (Hrsg.) Studies in the History and
Archaeology of Jordan VIII, pp. 217–223, Amman; co-author: Bastert, K.
 2004 Tell Johfiyeh, in Savage, S.H., Zamora, K.A. and Keller, D.R. (eds.), Archaeology
in Jordan, American Journal of Archaeology (AJA) 108, No.3, pp. 431–432; coauthor: al-Sa´ad, Z.
 2004 Neue Forschungen in Nordjordanien: Der eisenzeitliche Tell Johfiyeh und seine
Umgebung in Nordjordanien, Das Altertum 49,2: 81-85, Berlin.
 2004 Zwischen Wüste und Jordan. Tell Johfiyeh - Ein eisenzeitlicher Fundplatz in Nordjordanien,
Antike Welt - Zeitschrift für Archäologie und Kulturgeschichte, Heft 1/2004, Mainz, pp. 51–58.

External Links
 Photos of Tall Johfiyeh at the American Center of Research 

Archaeological sites in Jordan